Toll is a surname.  Notable people with the name include:

 Bruce E. Toll (born 1943), co-founder of Toll Brothers
 Catherine Toll (born 1959), American educator and politician from Vermont
 Eduard von Toll (1858–1902), Baltic German geologist and Arctic explorer
 Herman Toll (1907–1967), American politician from Pennsylvania
 Johan Christopher Toll (1743–1817), Swedish statesman and soldier
 John Toll (born 1952), American cinematographer
 John S. Toll (1923–2011), American physicist and educational administrator
 Karl Toll (1862–1936), Swedish officer
 Karl Wilhelm von Toll (1777–1842), Baltic German aristocrat and general
 Robert I. Toll (born 1940), co-founder of Toll Brothers
 Sergiusz Toll (1893–1961), Polish entomologist
 Steve Toll (born 1974), Canadian lacrosse executive and former player
 Winfried Toll (born 1955), German conductor, singer, composer and academic teacher

ru:Толь (значения)